Victors FC was a Ugandan association football team based in Kampala which played in the Ugandan Super League until their relegation in 2012.

Victors FC won the Ugandan Cup twice and also appeared in the CAF Confederations Cup. As part of their Confederations Cup run, the club saved $1,500 by requesting referees from Tanzania instead of Eritrea.

The club was relegated in 2013 and failed to register for the second division the following season.

Record in the top tier

Achievements
Ugandan Premier League: 0
Ugandan Cup: 2
2008, 2010.

African Cups history

External links

References

Football clubs in Uganda
Association football clubs established in 2001
Sport in Kampala
2001 establishments in Uganda
2013 disestablishments in Uganda